The 1916 College Football All-America team is composed of college football players who were selected as All-Americans for the 1916 college football season. The only selectors for the 1916 season who have been recognized as "official" by the National Collegiate Athletic Association (NCAA) are Walter Camp, whose selections were published in Collier's Weekly, the International News Service (INS), a newswire founded by William Randolph Hearst, and the Frank Menke Syndicate.  
 
Although not recognized by the NCAA, many other sports writers, newspapers, and coaches selected All-America teams in 1916. They include the United Press, Walter Eckersall (for the Chicago Daily Tribune), Paul Purman, Fielding H. Yost, and The Boston Post.

All-Americans of 1916

Ends

Bert Baston, Minnesota (College Football Hall of Fame) (WC-1; UP-1; INS-1; WE-1; PP-1; FY-1; BP-1; MS)
James P. Herron, Pittsburgh (WC-2; INS-2; WE-1; MS)
Charles Comerford, Yale (INS-1; BP-1)
George Moseley, Yale (WC-1; WE-2; FY-2)
Heinie Miller, Penn (WC-2; LP-1; FY-1)
Richard Harte, Harvard (INS-2; MON-1; FY-2)
Clifford Carlson, Pitt (Basketball Hall of Fame) (PP-2)
Tommy Whelan, Georgetown (PP-2)
Charles Highley, Princeton (UP-2; LP-1)
Stan Cofall, Notre Dame (UP-2; MS)
Paul Eckley, Cornell (WE-2)
Bob Higgins, Penn State (College Football Hall of Fame) (MON-1)
Charles Atherton Coolidge, Harvard (WC-3)
Graham Vowell, Tennessee (WC-3)

Tackles

Belford West, Colgate (WC-1; UP-1; INS-1; WE-1; PP-2; LP-1; BP-1)
Steamer Horning, Colgate (WC-1; WE-2; MS)
William Lippard McLean, Princeton (MON-1; FY-1; BP-1)
Artemus Gates, Yale (WC-2; UP-2; INS-2)
DeVitalis, Brown (UP-1; PP-1)
George Hauser, Minnesota (INS-1)
Mark Farnum, Brown (INS-2; MON-1)
Fred Becker, Iowa (WE-1)
Louis Seagrave, Washington (WC-3 [g]; PP-1)
Fred Gillies, Cornell (FY-1)
Bob Karch, Ohio State (FM)
Walter Herber Wheeler, Harvard (UP-2; LP-1; FY-2)
Clarence Ward, Navy (WC-2)
Earl Beacham, Tufts (PP-2)
Lewis Little, Penn (FY-2)
Frank A. R. Mayer, Minnesota (WE-2)
John Beckett, Oregon (College Football Hall of Fame) (WC-3)
Bob Ignico, Washington & Lee (WC-3)

Guards
Clinton Black, Yale (WC-1; UP-1; INS-1; WE-1; MON-1; PP-1; LP-1; FY-1; BP-1; MS)
Harrie Dadmun, Harvard (WC-1; UP-2; INS-2; WE-1; FY-1)
Frank T. Hogg, Princeton (WC-2; PP-1; MS)
Lawrence Fox, Yale (UP-1)
Claude E. Thornhill, Pitt (INS-1)
Charles Henning, Penn (FY-2; BP-1)
Christopher Schlachter, Syracuse (MON-1)
Charlie Bachman, Notre Dame (College Football Hall of Fame) (WC-2; LP-1)
Robert Lee Nourse, Princeton (WE-2; PP-2)
Sinclair, Minnesota (PP-2)
Monroe Good, Colgate (UP-2)
Mason Barton, Colgate (INS-2)
Arnold McInerney, Notre Dame (WE-2)
Budge Garrett, Rutgers (WC-3)

Centers

Bob Peck, Pittsburgh (College Football Hall of Fame) (WC-1; UP-1; INS-1; WE-1; MON-1; PP-1; BP-1; MS)
John McEwan, Army (WC-2; UP-2; INS-2; WE-2; PP-2)
Alfred Gennert, Princeton (LP-1; FY-1)
Fred Becker, Iowa (FY-2)
Pup Phillips, Georgia Tech (WC-3)

Quarterbacks
Oscar Anderson, Colgate (WC-1; UP-2; INS-1; BP-1; LP-1)
Fritz Shiverick, Cornell (UP-1; INS-2; PP-1; FY-2)
Bart Macomber, Illinois (College Football Hall of Fame) (WE-2; PP-2; FY-1)
Cliff Sparks, Michigan (MON-1)
James DeHart, Pitt (WE-1)
Clair Purdy, Brown (WC-2)
Irby Curry, Vanderbilt (WC-3)

Halfbacks
Chic Harley, Ohio State (College Football Hall of Fame) (WC-1; UP-1; INS-1; WE-1; PP-1; FY-1; BP-1)
Fritz Pollard, Brown (College and Pro Football Hall of Fame) (WC-1; UP-2; INS-2; WE-2; MON-1; PP-2; LP-1; BP-1; MS)
Andy Hastings, Pittsburgh (UP-1; INS-1)
Eddie Casey, Harvard (College Football Hall of Fame) (WC-2; WE-2; PP-1; FY-2)
Everett Strupper, Georgia Tech (College Football Hall of Fame) (PP-1 [e])
John Maulbetsch, Michigan (College Football Hall of Fame) (FY-1)
Harry LeGore, Yale (WC-2; INS-2; WE-2 [fb]; PP-2; LP-1 [fb]; FY-2)
Claire Long, Minnesota (FM)
Paddy Driscoll, Northwestern (College and Pro Football Hall of Fame) (WC-3; UP-2)
Johnny Gilroy, Georgetown (WC-3)

Fullbacks

Elmer Oliphant, Army (College Football Hall of Fame) (WC-1; UP-1; PP-1; INS-1; MON-1; LP-1 [hb]; BP-1; MS)
Joe Berry, Penn (WC-2; UP-1 [e]; INS-2; WE-1 [hb]; MON-1; FY-1)
Pudge Wyman, Minnesota (UP-2; WE-1; FY-2)
Arnold Horween, Harvard (PP-2)
McReaghy, Washington & Jefferson (WC-3)

Key
NCAA recognized selectors for 1916
 WC = Collier's Weekly as selected by Walter Camp
 INS = International News Service
 MS = Frank Menke Syndicate

Other selectors
 UP = United Press
 WE = Walter Eckersall, of the Chicago Daily Tribune
 FM = Frank G. Menke, former sporting editor of the International News Service (INS)
 MON = Monty, noted New York sports writer
 PP = Paul Purman, noted sports writer whose All-American team was syndicated in newspapers across the United States
 LP = Lawrence Perry, sporting editor of the New York Evening Post
 FY = Fielding H. Yost
 BP = The Boston Post, selected by Charles E. Parker, football expert of The Boston Post

Bold = Consensus All-American
 1 – First-team selection
 2 – Second-team selection
 3 – Third-team selection

See also
 1916 All-Big Ten Conference football team
 1916 All-Pacific Coast football team
 1916 All-Southern college football team
 1916 All-Western college football team

References

All-America Team
College Football All-America Teams